is a 1998 Japanese film directed by and starring Shinya Tsukamoto, and co-starring Hisashi Igawa, Sujin Kim, Kirina Mano, Takahiro Murase, Tatsuya Nakamura and Kyōka Suzuki. After his girlfriend commits suicide, a man (Shinya Tsukamoto) becomes embroiled in gang warfare attempting to obtain a gun in hopes to kill himself.

Synopsis
A few days after the suicide of his companion, Goda crosses in an alley Chisato, a girl whom he had met and saved not long before, while she was trying to throw herself under a train. But the latter, screaming at rape, the advertiser finds himself face to face with Goto and his gang. Assaulted and robbed, he is summoned by them to bring back all his money the next time. At the end of his rope, Goda decides to buy a weapon. But during the transaction, he does not notice that the weapon in question is just a simple water pistol. He then resolves to mount his own revolver with pieces of metal. He has only one obsession: to kill.

Cast
 Shinya Tsukamoto as  Goda
 Kirina Mano as Chisato
 Tatsuya Nakamura as Idei
 Takahiro Murase as Goto
 Kyōka Suzuki as Kiriko
 Hisashi Igawa as Kudo

Release
Bullet Ballet was first shown at the 55th Venice International Film Festival in September 1998. After the première, Tsukamoto decided to re-edit Bullet Ballet. After the Venice premiere, the Japanese company There's Enterprise offered to distribute the film in Japan. As Tsukamoto was busy with other festivals and developing his new film Gemini, he had to wait until Gemini was complete before finishing re-editing Bullet Ballet for the Japanese release. It was released in Japan on March 11, 2000.

The film was shown at the 1998 Toronto International Film Festival which showcased Japan as their country of focus in the festival's National Cinema program. The show was titled New Beat of Japan, which included Ping Pong Hot Springs, After Life, Beautiful Sunday, Happy Go Lucky and Cure.

Reception
Variety gave the film a negative review, stating that "some may respond to the new thriller’s brooding B&W visuals and its spasmodic bursts of hammering violence, most followers of the director will see it merely as more of the same." Time Out gave the film a negative review, describing the film as "aggro art, intense, gut-felt - but also, like all Tsukamoto's work, numbingly over-stretched."

See also
 List of Japanese films of 1998

References

Sources

External links
 
 

1998 films
Japanese black-and-white films
1990s Japanese-language films
1998 crime thriller films
Japanese crime thriller films
Films directed by Shinya Tsukamoto
Films scored by Chu Ishikawa
1990s Japanese films